National and local plebiscites for the approval of the proposed constitutional amendments and local bills made by the Interim Batasang Pambansa were held on January 27, 1984 in the Philippines.

Constitutional amendments 
The majority of the Filipino people voted "Yes" to the terms and constitutional amendments. But several opposition politicians, like Jose Diokno and Lorenzo Tañada, called for a boycott. Below are the constitutional amendments as a result of the plebiscite:

Creating the Office of the Vice President of the Philippines (OVP)
Abolishing the Executive Committee
Elections for the regular members of the Batasang Pambansa by provinces, highly urbanized cities, and districts of Metro Manila
Land grant and urban housing program

Results

On districting the Batasang Pambansa

On abolishing the Executive Committee and restoring the vice presidency

On allowing indigents to possess public lands by grants

On the state undertaking an urban land reform program

References 

1984 elections in the Philippines
1984 referendums
Constitutional referendums in the Philippines
Presidency of Ferdinand Marcos